Las Victorias National Park is located in Alta Verapaz, Guatemala, on the north-western outskirts of the city of Cobán. Formerly a finca acquired in the mid-19th century by the French coffee grower Jules Rossignon, Las Victorias was designated a national park in 1980. The park covers an area of 82 ha, and is managed by the National Forestry Institute (INAB).

References

National parks of Guatemala
Protected areas established in 1980